Oophana is a genus of air-breathing land snails, terrestrial pulmonate gastropod mollusks in the subfamily Streptaxinae  of the family Streptaxidae.

Distribution 
Distribution of the genus Oophana include:
 South-East Asia

Species
Species within the genus Oophana include:
 Oophana acuticarina van Benthem Jutting, 1961
 Oophana atopospira van Benthem Jutting, 1954
 Oophana balingensis (Tomlin, 1948)
 Oophana bulbulus (Morelet, 1862) - type species
 Oophana diaphanopepla van Benthem Jutting
 Oophana diplodon (Möllendorff, 1900)
 Oophana eutropha van Benthem Jutting, 1954
 Oophana elisa Gould, 1856
 Oophana huberi Thach, 2018
 Oophana michaui (Crosse & P. Fischer, 1863)
 Oophana pachyglottis (Möllendorff, 1900)
 Oophana siamensis (L. Pfeiffer, 1862)
 Oophana striatula (Collinge, 1902)
 Oophana thamnophila van Benthem Jutting, 1954
 Oophana thuthaoae Thach, 2017
 Oophana tiomanensis Clements, 2006

References

 Bank, R. A. (2017). Classification of the Recent terrestrial Gastropoda of the World. Last update: July 16, 2017.
 Van Bentham Jutting W. S. S. (1954). "The Malayan Streptaxidae of the genera Discartemon and Oophana". Bulletin of the Raffles Museum 25: 71–106. PDF.

External links
 Ancey, C. F. (1884). Sur les divisions proposées dans le genre Streptaxis. Le Naturaliste. 6(50): 399

Streptaxidae